Abhimanyu Easwaran (born 6 September 1995) is an Indian cricketer who plays for Bengal. He is a right-handed opening batter.

Early life
Abhimanyu was born on 6 September 1995 in Dehradun to a Tamilian father and Punjabi mother. In his early years, he was trained by his father Ranganathan Parameshwaran Easwaran, a chartered accountant, who had started the Abhimanyu Cricket Academy in 2008. At age 10, Abhimanyu moved to Kolkata to pursue his cricket career, where he lived with his coach Nirmal Sengupta.

Career
He made his Twenty20 debut for Bengal in the 2016–17 Inter State Twenty-20 Tournament on 31 January 2017. In October 2018, he was named in India A's squad for the 2018–19 Deodhar Trophy. He was the leading run-scorer for Bengal in the 2018–19 Ranji Trophy, with 861 runs in six matches.

In August 2019, he was named in the India Red team's squad for the 2019–20 Duleep Trophy. In the final of the tournament, he scored 153 runs against India Green. In October 2019, he was named in India A's squad for the 2019–20 Deodhar Trophy.

In January 2021, he was named as one of five standby players in India's Test squad for their home series against England. In May 2021, he was also named as one of four standby players in India's Test squad for the final of the 2019–2021 ICC World Test Championship and their away series against England.

See also
 Abhimanyu Cricket Academy
 List of Bengal cricketers

References

External links
 

1995 births
Living people
Indian cricketers
Bengal cricketers
Prime Bank Cricket Club cricketers
India Blue cricketers
Sportspeople from Dehradun
Cricketers from Uttarakhand
Indian A cricketers